Forever and Ever – Definitive Collection is a greatest hits album by Greek singer Demis Roussos, released in 2002 by the Philips Music Group.

Commercial performance 
The album debuted at no. 17 in the UK.

Track listing

Charts

References

External links 
 Demis Roussos – Forever and Ever – Definitive Collection (CD) at Discogs

2002 compilation albums
Demis Roussos albums
Philips Records albums